Mera Ruben Nilson (English: More Ruben Nilson) is an album by the Swedish folk singer-songwriter and guitar player Fred Åkerström.

Track listing
 Den sanna sjömansvisan
 Syndafloden
 Sjukbesök
 Full tid
 Rallarevisa
 Gårdmusikanter
 Positivhalaren
 Begravningsentreprenörerna
 Önskevisa
 Adam och Eva
 Fru Kristina
 Balladen om eken
 Ungkarlsvisan

External links

1971 albums
Fred Åkerström albums
Swedish-language albums